Nikita Pavlovich Simonyan (born Mkrtych Pogosovich Simonyan, 12 October 1926) is a Soviet-Russian former football striker and coach of Armenian descent. He was born in Armavir. As of 2021 he was the Russian football functionary First Vice-President of the Russian Football Union. Simonyan was awarded the Honoured Master of Sports of the USSR title in 1954, the Honored Coach of Russia title in 1968, the Merited Coach of the USSR title in 1970 and the Commander of the Order "For Services to the Fatherland" award in 2011. Simonyan is the top scorer in the history of the club Spartak Moscow at 160 goals.

Club career

Simonyan was a player for FC Dinamo Sukhumi during his youth career.  After sixteen years of living in Sokhumi, Simonyan moved to Moscow, where he joined the local club FC Krylya Sovetov Moscow, also known as the "Wings of the Soviets". Gorokhov became Simonyan's first coach in Moscow. 

After Krylya Sovetov Moscow came in last place at the 1948 Soviet Top League, the club was disbanded. Simonyan signed with Spartak Moscow in 1949. In his first year, Spartak Moscow came in third place at the 1949 Soviet Top League. Simonyan and Spartak finally achieved victory in the 1952 Soviet Top League. He made 233 appearances and scored 133 goals for Spartak in his career.

International career
Simonyan joined the Soviet Union national football team in 1954. He competed with the team at the 1956 Summer Olympics in Melbourne. The team defeated Germany, Indonesia, Bulgaria and finally Yugoslavia to win the gold medal in football.

Simonyan was a member of the Soviet football team at the 1958 FIFA World Cup, its first World Cup. Because Team Captain Igor Netto was unable to play due to injury for most of the World Cup, Simonyan was named Captain of the team in his place. The team was placed in Group 4. Simonyan scored a goal against England, and the Soviet team would have been defeated without it. The Soviet Union lost to the Pelé-led Brazil team in the final group game. The USSR came in second place, which qualified them for the knockout stage. They were defeated by Sweden. Simonyan played his last match on 19 June 1958. Out of 20 internationals for the team, he scored 10 goals.

Managerial career

After retiring from football as a player, Simonyan became the manager and head coach of Spartak Moscow in 1960. After Simonyan and Spartak won the 1965 Soviet Cup, Simonyan stopped managing the club. He started managing Spartak again in 1967. Spartak made it to the Top League finals again in 1968 but did not win. The club won the 1969 Soviet Top League, their second Top League title with Simonyan as head coach and manager. Simonyan and Spartak won the 1971 Soviet Cup. Simonyan stopped managing Spartak for good in 1972. 

Simonyan, an Armenian himself, began managing and coaching Armenian club FC Ararat Yerevan in 1973. He led the club to victory at 1973 Soviet Top League. Ararat Yerevan won the 1973 Soviet Cup as well that year. Under Simonyan, the club won its first Soviet titles. Simonyan stopped leading the club in 1974. He came back to Ararat Yerevan in 1984 and stopped managing for good in 1985.

Administrative career

Simonyan later worked in senior positions at the Football Federation of the Soviet Union, Sports Committee of the USSR and the Russian Football Union. On 24 November 2009, Simonyan was appointed acting president of the Russian Football Union following the resignation of Vitaly Mutko. Simonyan was in office until 3 February 2010. At a special conference of the Russian Football Union, Sergei Fursenko was chosen as the new president on 3 February.

Simonyan was in attendance for the UEFA Euro 2012 match between Russia and Armenia in Yerevan, which ended in a draw. On 25 March 2011, the day before the match, Armenian President Serzh Sargsyan awarded Nikita Simonyan with the "Medal of Honor." At the award ceremony, Simonyan said:

I am honored to receive this esteemed award. You know, I'm one hundred percent Armenian. My parents, being Armenians from Artvin, once escaped from the genocide. My father was a great patriot. For me it was a great honor to lead the national team in 1973, "Ararat." And what did these guys win the title and the cup for me, as a coach, was a holiday. You can not pass, as it responded to the people. Indeed, it was a great team. So I'm a generation, and of course, all our people just grateful and worship.

After Sergei Fursenko resigned on 25 June 2012, Simonyan was appointed acting president of the Russian Football Union for a second time. Simonyan left office on 3 September 2012, when Nikolai Tolstykh was elected president of the Russian Football Union.

Simonyan, along with fellow Spartak veteran Alexander Mirzoyan, sent well wishes to Yura Movsisyan in connection with his becoming a Spartak player. Simonyan wrote to Movsisyan, “Dear Yura, I hope that you win more titles at Spartak than I. I wish you success!” Movsisyan replied: “It will be difficult to exceed Simonyan’s achievements—[both] as a player and a coach. Thanks very much for such valuable gift. I know of Simonyan and Mirzoyan as the greatest players, and I am proud to be an Armenian just like them. I have not seen them play, but I know that they have done a lot for Spartak. I am not even close to them [in terms of accomplishments]. [But] I certainly do have plans. I want to score goals and achieve wins. [And] when something goes successfully, I will enter into history at that time.” On 19 February 2013, Simonyan attended the grand opening of the new Spartak arena. He reminisced that if he were 20 years younger, he would be happy to still play for the club.

Honours

Club
Player
Spartak Moscow
Soviet Top League (4): 1952, 1953, 1956, 1958
Soviet Cup (2): 1950, 1958
Soviet Top League Top Goalscorer (3): 1949 (26 goals), 1950 (34 goals), 1953 (14 goals)

Manager
Spartak Moscow
Soviet Top League (2): 1962, 1969
Soviet Cup (3): 1963, 1965, 1971

Ararat Yerevan
Soviet Top League (1): 1973
Soviet Cup (1): 1973

Country
Soviet Union
Olympic Games (1): Gold Medal 1956
FIFA World Cup (1): 1958 Quarterfinalist

Individual
Order of Merit for the Fatherland 3rd class
Order of Merit for the Fatherland 4th class
Order of Friendship
Order of the Red Banner of Labour
Order of the Badge of Honor
Jubilee Medal "In Commemoration of the 100th Anniversary since the Birth of Vladimir Il'ich Lenin"
Medal "Veteran of Labour"
Olympic Order

References

External links

Profile and interview 

1926 births
Living people
People from Armavir, Russia
Soviet footballers
Armenian footballers
Russian footballers
Soviet Top League players
FC Spartak Moscow players
Soviet Union international footballers
Armenian football managers
Russian football managers
Soviet football managers
FC Spartak Moscow managers
FC Ararat Yerevan managers
FC Chornomorets Odesa managers
Soviet Union national football team managers
Honoured Masters of Sport of the USSR
Olympic footballers of the Soviet Union
Footballers at the 1956 Summer Olympics
Olympic gold medalists for the Soviet Union
Olympic medalists in football
1958 FIFA World Cup players
Russian people of Armenian descent
Soviet Armenians
Russian football chairmen and investors
Association football forwards
Medalists at the 1956 Summer Olympics
Presidents of the Russian Football Union